Akre District is a district in Duhok Governorate, Kurdistan Region. The administrative center is the city of Akre.

References 

Districts of Dohuk Province
Geography of Iraqi Kurdistan
Districts of Nineveh Governorate